The National Kindergarten Association (NKA) was a philanthropic organization, based in the United States, which promoted universal acceptance of the public-school kindergarten. It existed between 1909 and 1976, and its headquarters was in New York City. According to the New York Times, the association was founded to "promote the establishment of kindergartens throughout the United States for the purpose of promoting the physical, moral and intellectual development" of the children in attendance.

History
Founded by Bessie Locke in 1909, initially as the National Association for the Promotion of Kindergarten Education, the NKA functioned on the local, state and national levels.

The company was initially based in New York City's brand-new Metropolitan Life Insurance Company Tower, located at 1 Madison Avenue in Manhattan, but later moved one mile north to 8 West 40th Street, on the southern side of Bryant Park.

The association once received a $250,000 donation from oil executive John Dustin Archbold. Archbold's wife, Annie Eliza Mills, was elected to the association's board of directors in 1911.

By late 1927, the association reported that 206 kindergartens had opened across the United States over the course of the year, bringing the total up to 942. Those kindergartens had 356,000 children in their care. There were, however, still four million children without access to a kindergarten.<ref>"206 New Kindergartens" - New York Times, November 30, 1927</ref>

Seven years later, in the association's 25th anniversary year, it had brought about the opening of almost two thousand kindergartens in total across the United States, bringing kindergarten classes to around 628,000 children. 

By 1952, the totals had increased to over 3,200 kindergartens and 1.6 million children. 

The organization was affiliated with the General Federation of Women's Clubs and the National Congress of Mothers (which became the PTA), and its field secretaries in each state worked with the women's clubs to inform the public about the kindergarten's importance and to promote improved state legislation relating to kindergartens.Maryland Kindergarten Collection - Kelly Peters, Pratt Library (Baltimore)

In 1912, National Kindergarten and Elementary College (now National Louis University) became affiliated with the NKA.

From 1913 to 1919, the NKA worked with the United States Bureau of Education to promote the kindergarten.

In an attempt to raise awareness in areas where no kindergartens existed, the NKA published education materials and distributed them nationwide between 1917 and 1954.

In 1920, Talks to Mothers: Reading Aloud to the Child was published, a collaboration between Lucy Wheelock, NKA and the Bureau of Education.

In the 1930s and 1940s, the NKA lobbied in Washington, D.C., for a permanent form of federal aid for kindergartens. 

Bessie Locke died on April 9, 1952, aged 86. Her association remained in business for the next 24 years.

In 1957, the NKA published About Kindergarten as part of its promotion for community programming.

The following year, John H. Niemeyer, president of the Bank Street College of Education, became the NKA president, succeeding Dr. Howard Richard Best, who died on August 6, aged 63.

The National Kindergarten Association dissolved in 1976.

References

External links
"Why Should the Kindergarten be a Part of the Public School System?" - Kate Baldwin Free Kindergarten Association (reprinted by the National Kindergarten Association)
"Kindergarten Legislation" - National Kindergarten Association (published October 1920)
"Begin at the Beginning" - National Kindergarten Association (published circa 1921)
"National Kindergarten Association Letter, 1922" - National Kindergarten Association
"Suggestions for Arousing Interest in the Kindergarten - National Kindergarten Association
"Planning to Extend the Kindergarten" - New York Times, September 19, 1920
"Value of the Kindergarten" - Bessie Locke, New York Times'', July 12, 1935

1909 establishments in New York City
1976 disestablishments in New York (state)
Organizations established in 1909
Organizations disestablished in 1976
Education in the United States
Kindergarten